Craig Malcolm is a Scottish footballer, who plays as a striker for Stranraer.

During his career, Malcolm has played for Raith Rovers, Arthurlie, Ayr United, Alloa Athletic, Stranraer and East Kilbride.

Career
After leaving Raith Rovers following an unsuccessful two years at the club, Malcolm joined Junior club, Arthurlie. In 2010, Malcolm moved to Third Division club, Stranraer. While in his three years at Stair Park, he notched up a total of 48 goals in 112 games in all-competitions.

Following the 2011–12 season, Stranraer were promoted to Second Division, despite losing in the play-off final to Albion Rovers as a result of Rangers' liquidation, Malcolm was Stranraer's top scorer in both the league and all competitions throughout the campaign. In the next season, Malcolm played an integral part in Stranraer staying up, scoring two goals against Stenhousemuir, that secured their safety, as well as bagging a total of 19 goals in all competitions, 18 of those in the league.

In 2013, Malcolm signed for Ayr United. After one season there he returned to Stranraer. Malcolm spent a further three seasons with Stranraer, before leaving the club in May 2017. Malcolm subsequently signed for fellow Scottish League One club Alloa Athletic on 31 May 2017. He joined Lowland League club East Kilbride on loan from Alloa in January 2018 and after moving permanently the following June was subsequently named East Kilbride's captain. In February 2020, Malcolm and teammate David Proctor took interim charge of the team after the departure of previous interim manager Jim Paterson.

East Kilbride announced that Malcolm had left the club on 12 January 2022. He finished the season with West of Scotland Football League side St Roch's before returning for a third spell with Stranraer in the summer of 2022.

Personal life
Outside of football, Malcolm worked as a heating and refrigerator engineer.

Honours
East Kilbride
 Lowland Football League:  2018–19
 SFA South Region Challenge Cup:: 2018–19

References

External links

1986 births
Living people
Scottish footballers
Association football forwards
Raith Rovers F.C. players
Arthurlie F.C. players
Stranraer F.C. players
Ayr United F.C. players
Alloa Athletic F.C. players
Scottish Football League players
Scottish Professional Football League players
Footballers from Bellshill
East Kilbride F.C. players
Lowland Football League players